Pedro Menendez High School is a public high school in the St. Johns County School District, located in southern St. Johns County, Florida, United States. It was named for Pedro Menéndez de Avilés, a sixteenth-century Spanish admiral and pirate hunter who founded St. Augustine, the first permanent European settlement and oldest port city in what is now the continental United States, on August 28, 1565.

It has a student body of over 1,300 students.  The school building is a two-story octagon with an open courtyard in the center.  The gymnasium and auditorium are attached on the east and west sides, respectively. The school was built simultaneously with Bartram Trail High School; Menendez was intended to relieve overcrowding at St. Augustine High School. The school opened August 28, 2000, and graduated its first class in 2001.

Their curriculum offers academy programs in the areas of business & computer technology, health science and architectural & building sciences.

Attendance boundary
Communities within the school's attendance boundary include: Butler Beach, Crescent Beach, Flagler Estates, Hastings, Marineland, St. Augustine Shores, and St. Augustine South. It also includes a small portion of St. Augustine Beach.

Advanced scholarship
The Advanced Scholars program gives students the option to participate in the rigorous programs of advanced placement, dual enrollment and honors courses. After two years of preliminary work, the school was approved for the International Baccalaureate Program, beginning in the Fall of 2010.

Notable alumni
Willie Harvey Jr., NFL player
Avery Romero, second baseman, currently playing in the MLB for the Colorado Rockies
Tony Steward, former linebacker for the Buffalo Bills and New Orleans Saints; winner of the 2010 Dick Butkus Award, given annually to the top high school linebacker in the country

References

External links 
 
Falcon Boosters website
Alumni website

High schools in St. Johns County, Florida
Educational institutions established in 2000
Public high schools in Florida
2000 establishments in Florida